The Megaphone – Crocetta List  was a regional centre-left political party active in Sicily, Italy. The party was led by Rosario Crocetta, the former President of Sicily, also affiliated to the Democratic Party.

History
In the 2012 Sicilian regional election the party won 6.2% of the vote and 5 seats in the Sicilian Regional Assembly.

In the 2013 Italian general election the party filed a list only for the Senate in Sicily as part of the centre-left coalition Italy. Common Good, garnered 6.2% of the vote in the region and had one senator, Giuseppe Lumia, elected.

Electoral results

Senate of the Republic

Sicilian Regional Assembly

References

Political parties in Sicily
Political parties established in 2012
2012 establishments in Italy